Katrina Sarah Milne is a New Zealand dairy farmer. From 2017 to 2020, she was president of Federated Farmers, the first woman president in the organisation's history.

Biography 
Milne became involved with Federated Farmers in 1991, and served as a board member and provincial president for the West Coast branch. In 2017 she was appointed national president. She has also served on the National Animal Welfare Advisory Committee, chaired the West Coast TB Free Committee and was a member of the Farmer Mental Wellness Strategy Group. Milne is a director of Westland Milk Products, and helped found the Lake Brunner Community Catchment Care Group.

In 2015 Milne was named Fonterra Dairy Woman of the Year and also won the rural category of the New Zealand Women of Influence Awards.

References

Living people
New Zealand farmers
New Zealand women farmers
New Zealand Women of Influence Award recipients
Date of birth missing (living people)
Year of birth missing (living people)